The Devolli mine is a large mine in the south-east of Albania in Korçë County 114 km south-east of the capital, Tirana. Devolli represents the largest nickel reserve in Albania having estimated reserves of 35.6 million tonnes of ore grading 1.2% nickel. The 35.6 million tonnes of ore contains 427,000 tonnes of nickel metal.

References

External links 
 Official site

Nickel mines in Albania
Surface mines in Albania
Devoll (municipality)